Catholic of Pointe Coupee  is a Catholic Interparochial school in New Roads, Louisiana.  It was founded in 1904 by the Sisters of St. Joseph who were commissioned to bring Catholic education to Pointe Coupee Parish.

History

Catholic of Pointe Coupee has been affiliated with the Sisters of St. Joseph since its conception.  The school has been housed in several different buildings over its lifetime, beginning in a small four-room cottage on St. Mary Street, then moving up to a slightly larger building which was destroyed by fire in 1929.  Then the school moved into a large wood-framed building donated by the Richey Family.  The School/convent remained in that building until the early 1960s when a modern facility was completed on Fourth Street which houses the school to this day.

In 2005 and 2006, the School was host to many students from Hurricane Katrina destroyed Catholic schools in the New Orleans area, including Redeemer Seton High.

Demographics
The demographic breakdown of the 305 students enrolled for the 2013–2014 school year was:

Asian/Pacific islanders - 0.4%
Black - 13.1%
Hispanic - 1.6%
White - 84.9%

Athletics
Catholic High athletics competes in the LHSAA. 

The school competes in 1A and offers a number of sports and after school programs, including football, soccer, power lifting, baseball, softball, basketball, cross-country, track, cheer and dance.

Championships
Football championships
(1) State Championship: 1978

Baseball
(2) State Championships: 1972, 1986

Boys' power lifting
(5) State Championships: 1988, 1992, 2007, 2008, 2009 

Girls' power lifting
(4) State Championships: 1992, 2005, 2008, 2009

Notable alumni
Donald J. Cazayoux, Jr. - politician
Robert M. Marionneaux - politician

References

External links 

Educational institutions established in 1904
Catholic secondary schools in Louisiana
Schools in Pointe Coupee Parish, Louisiana
Private middle schools in Louisiana
1904 establishments in Louisiana